Pembertonia may refer to:
 Pembertonia (plant), a genus of plants in the family Asteraceae
 Pembertonia, a genus of wasps in the family Agaonidae, synonym of Meselatus
 Pembertonia, a genus of beetles in the family Dryophthoridae, synonym of Dryophthoroides